Virgílio Clímaco Damásio (Itaparica, January 21, 1838 – Salvador, November 21, 1913) was a Brazilian Physician and Politician. He was governor of Bahia on two occasions.

Biography 
He was born in the parish of Itaparica, son of Francisco Borja Damásio and Maria Amália Clímaco de Sousa. He studied medicine at the Faculty of Medicine of Bahia, graduating in 1859.

He began his political life at the age of 28, running for the Provincial Assembly, already a defender of the Republic. He was vice president of the Republican Party of Bahia, when it was founded in 1889. After his terms as governor, he was a senator.

Professor at the Faculty of Medicine of Bahia, he was a member of the educational commissions of the wide-ranging reform of teaching, designed by Manuel Vitorino, whose proposals, which were too revolutionary for current conservatism, would cause the governor's removal.

He was a doctor of Rui Barbosa, of whom he was a cousin, and in the Casa de Rui Barbosa Foundation there are facts, images and documents about him.

Government of Bahia 
In the troubled period that followed the Proclamation of the Republic, Bahia experienced moments when changes in the regime seemed to lead to a confrontation between the diverse and confused currents that manifested themselves – first against the new order and then, before its inevitability, favorable.

Despite this, there was no continuity solution among those who ruled the state at the time: it was up to the Legislative Assembly, still elected in the empire, by its president Augusto Guimarães, to take over the provisional government.

The head of the medical school, Manuel Vitorino, had been appointed to the highest position in the state. However, refusing to take office in a barracks, he ceased to assume the government, for a period of thirteen days – a time when the position was occupied by Virgílio Damásio who, for all intents and purposes, became the first governor of Bahia in the republican period.

Damásio, along with other Republicans, had celebrated the proclamation on the afternoon of November 16, 1889, in a concentration in front of the São Pedro Fort. At night, an unusual confrontation had threatened the Republicans who were celebrating: the group was severely attacked by black adherents of the monarchy, defenders of Princess Isabel, members of a militia called " Black Guard " ... With police intervention, the order was made in the city.

Finally assuming Manuel Victorino, he is unable to remain in office. Away, Marshal Hermes Ernesto da Fonseca – brother of Deodoro da Fonseca and father of the future president, Hermes da Fonseca, takes over. Already old and in fragile health, the marshal is only five months in charge of the position, which he passes to the vice governor – during all this time, Virgílio Damásio.

In a definitive way, therefore, Damásio takes office on September 14, 1890, and rules until November 15 of the same year – a time when he promoted the reform of the teaching of legal medicine in the state and instituted the state constituent.

References 

19th-century Brazilian physicians
1838 births
1913 deaths